Koeppen is a German surname. Notable people with the surname include:

 Adolf Otto Koeppen (1902–1972), German painter
 Andreas Koeppen (born 1961), German politician (SPD)
 Hans Koeppen (1876–1948), German soldier and race driver
 Jens Koeppen (born 1962), German politician (CDU)
 Martina Koeppen (born 1967), German politician (SPD)
 Werner Koeppen (1910–1994), German Nazi, assistant to Alfred Rosenberg
 Wolfgang Koeppen (1906–1996), German author

See also
 Köppen
 Koppen

German-language surnames